Nathaniel Apa (born 15 June 1995) is a New Zealand rugby union player who currently plays as a midfield back for Waikato in the Mitre 10 Cup. He has also played for Canterbury.

During the 2015 Super Rugby season he made 2 appearances as a member of the  wider training squad.

Apa represented Samoa in the 2014 IRB Junior World Championship and New Zealand in the 2015 edition.

References

1995 births
Living people
New Zealand rugby union players
Rugby union centres
Rugby union wings
Canterbury rugby union players
Crusaders (rugby union) players
People educated at Kelston Boys' High School
Samoan emigrants to New Zealand
New Zealand sportspeople of Samoan descent
Sportspeople from Apia
Waikato rugby union players